The 18th Canadian Folk Music Awards will be presented between March 31 and April 2, 2023, to honour achievements in folk music by Canadian artists in 2022. Nominees were announced in October 2022.

Nominees and recipients

References

External links
 Canadian Folk Music Awards

18
Canadian Folk Music Awards
Canadian Folk Music Awards
Canadian Folk
Canadian Folk Music
Canadian Folk Music